John Merritt may refer to:
 John Merritt (baseball) (1894–1955), outfielder in Major League Baseball
 John Merritt (editor) (1920–1999), English film editor
 John Merritt (American football) (1926–1983), American football coach
 John Merritt (public servant) (born 1959), Victorian public servant
 John O. Merritt (fl. 1970s–2000s), stereoscopy expert